Dominic Rowe (born 23 April 1993) is an English semi-professional footballer who plays for Frickley Athletic, as a winger.

Career
Born in Leeds, Rowe began his career with the youth team of Bradford City, and was awarded a first-team squad number in February 2011, alongside Alex Flett, with squad number 32. In March 2011, Rowe made Bradford's matchday squad for the first time, before making
his senior debut for Bradford on 15 April 2011, in a 0–4 defeat away at Southend United. Rowe was offered his first professional contract by Bradford on 9 May 2011.

He joined Barrow on loan on 29 September 2011, making his debut two days later as a 48th-minute substitute in Barrow's 1–5 defeat away at Luton Town. On 31 October 2011, the loan deal was extended until 29 December 2011.

On 25 October 2011, Rowe signed a new 20-month contract with Bradford City.

His contract was cancelled by Bradford City in August 2012.

He signed for Harrogate Town in August 2013.

After being released by Harrogate, he signed for Scarborough Athletic in May 2015. He stated he was willing to drop down a division in order to play games. He left the club in October 2015 to join Frickley Athletic. His performances for Scarborough were criticised by the team's manager.

Career statistics

References

1993 births
Living people
English footballers
Bradford City A.F.C. players
Barrow A.F.C. players
Harrogate Town A.F.C. players
Scarborough Athletic F.C. players
Frickley Athletic F.C. players
English Football League players
Association football wingers